Galofre is a surname. Notable people with the surname include:

Baldomer Galofre (1845–1902), Spanish painter
Julio Galofre (born 1987), Colombian swimmer